The Government of Ireland is the cabinet that exercises executive authority in the Republic of Ireland. Its ministers are collectively responsible for the Departments of State administered by the members of the Government.

, twenty-two women have served as cabinet ministers in governments of the Republic of Ireland and its predecessors the Irish Free State (1922–1937) and the Irish Republic (1919–1922). After a 58-year gap between the first and second women ministers, there has been at least one woman in all cabinets since December 1982. No woman has ever been Taoiseach (prime minister), but four women have served as Tánaiste (deputy prime minister).

Other women have served outside the cabinet as junior ministers, known until 1978 as Parliamentary Secretaries, and since then as Ministers of State. For example, five of the twenty Ministers of State appointed by the government of Micheál Martin in June 2020 were women, with two regularly attending cabinet.

The 32nd Government of Ireland was formed in June 2020 by Taoiseach Micheál Martin.  it includes four women as ministers in the cabinet: Norma Foley, Heather Humphreys, Catherine Martin and Helen McEntee. No more than four women have served in cabinet at any one time. Criticism of the imbalance is defended by pointing to male dominance of the Oireachtas (parliament) from which ministers are appointed.

Constitution
The 1937 Constitution of Ireland requires the government to consist of between seven and fifteen members, including the Taoiseach (prime minister). The Taoiseach is elected by Dáil Éireann (the lower house of the Oireachtas), and chooses the other ministers including the Tánaiste (deputy prime minister).

Since the formation of the 12th Government of Ireland in 1966, all Irish cabinets have been formed with the constitutional maximum of fifteen ministers. The total sometimes falls below this number for brief periods following the resignation of individual ministers or the withdrawal of a party from a coalition. For example, six ministers resigned in January 2011 from the 28th Government of Ireland, and were not replaced until March, when the 29th Government was formed after the general election in February.

Only three ministerial offices are specifically identified in the constitution: Taoiseach, Tánaiste and Minister for Finance. No woman has ever been appointed as Taoiseach or Minister for Finance. However, four women have served as Tánaiste. The first woman Tánaiste was Mary Harney (1997–2006), who in 1993 had become the first woman to lead a political party in the Dáil. Harney was followed by Mary Coughlan (2008–2011), Joan Burton (2014–2016), and Frances Fitzgerald (2016–2017).

Each minister must be a member of the Oireachtas (the national parliament), whose eligibility criteria for membership are defined as being "without distinction of sex". Up to two members of the Government may be members of Seanad Éireann, the upper house of the Oireachtas, but the only three senators ever appointed as ministers were men. All women in Irish cabinets have been Teachtaí Dála (TDs), i.e. members of Dáil Éireann.

History

The first woman cabinet minister in Ireland was Constance Markievicz, who in April 1919 became Minister for Labour in the Second Ministry of the revolutionary First Dáil. She was only the second woman minister in the national government of any country, after Alexandra Kollontai's appointment in 1917 as People's Commissar in the Russian Soviet Federative Socialist Republic.

When the Second Dáil assembled in August 1921, Markievicz continued as Minister for Labour, but her post was no longer at cabinet level in the Government of the Second Dáil. Markievicz and other ministers opposed to the Anglo-Irish Treaty resigned from the Government on 9 January 1922.

Only two women were returned to the Third Dáil in the general election in June 1922, down from six at the 1921 election, when 4.7% of TDs were women. The 1920s and 1930s were a conservative period in Ireland, in which women's rights were reversed, and no women were members of the Executive Council of the 1922–1937 Irish Free State. From the 1930s to the 1960s most women TDs were widows or other relatives of deceased TDs, and the 4.7% ratio achieved in 1921 was not equalled again until the 1981 general election returned 11 women, who comprised 6.6% of the 22nd Dáil.

More than 58 years elapsed between Markievicz leaving office and the appointment in December 1979 of Máire Geoghegan-Quinn as the second woman in cabinet. In 1977, Geoghegan-Quinn had become the first woman since Markievicz to serve as a junior minister in the Irish government, when Jack Lynch appointed her as Parliamentary Secretary to the Minister for Industry and Commerce. Two years later, aged 29, she was "flabbergasted" to become Minister for the Gaeltacht in the first cabinet of Taoiseach Charles Haughey.

Since then, the only all-male Irish government was the March–December 1982 second government of Charles Haughey. All cabinets since December 1982 have included at least one woman. The first time two women served as ministers simultaneously was in January 1993, when Taoiseach Albert Reynolds included both Máire Geoghegan-Quinn and Niamh Bhreathnach in his cabinet. Bhreathnach was the first woman to be appointed as minister at the start of her first Dáil term, and the only one until Katherine Zappone became Minister for Children and Youth Affairs in May 2016.

Political scientists Yvonne Galligan and Fiona Buckley note that women have been grossly under-represented in Irish politics, with men making up 91% of all cabinet appointments between 1919 and June 2017. They also found that women in the Irish cabinet are twice as likely to hold a social portfolio (48%) than an economic portfolio (24%). By contrast, only 17% of men held social portfolios, and 52% held an economic or foreign affairs portfolio.

All but two of the women who have served as ministers since 1919 are still alive. The first Irish woman minister, Constance Markievicz, died in 1927, and the third, Eileen Desmond, died in 2005. Ireland's oldest living woman former minister is -year-old Mary O'Rourke.

Calls for gender balance

The highest number of women ever in an Irish cabinet is four, a number first reached in 2004–2007, and again in each from 2014 to the present. However, this amounts to only 27% of the 15 ministers, and has been criticised by the National Women's Council of Ireland as "way off a gender-balanced Cabinet".

In 2014, then Taoiseach Enda Kenny pledged that if re-elected he would appoint a cabinet "50:50 on merit, of men and women". When Kenny formed the 30th Government in May 2016 with four women ministers out of fifteen, he was criticised by women campaigners for the lack of increase. Minister Regina Doherty defended Kenny, saying he had "probably done the best that he can do". TheJournal.ie noted that the "proportion of senior ministers who are women is 27%, higher than the 22% of TDs". In June 2017, Kenny's successor Leo Varadkar also appointed four women to his cabinet. He too was criticised for not including more women, but replied that "your ministerial team generally reflects the composition of the Dáil". Varadkar promised "to make sure we have many more women in our next parliamentary party so that I can promote many more women".

In February 2018, Minister for Culture, Heritage and the Gaeltacht Josepha Madigan launched a programme of commemoration of the centenary of women's enfranchisement. The Representation of the People Act 1918 gave limited voting rights for women. The right to stand for election was granted later in 1918, by the Parliament (Qualification of Women) Act. Madigan said the Irish State "failed women for far too long," and that it was time to "redouble our efforts" to provide equal opportunities. Former Tánaiste Joan Burton called for the next government to consist of an equal number of men and women.

List of women ministers
Numerical order represents the order of first appointment to the cabinet.Age represents age on appointment to that office.

Timeline

Number of women ministers in each Cabinet

Notes

References

Bibliography 

 

Government ministers
+Women
Ireland
 List